The Canadian province of Alberta has a provincial highway network consisting of over  of roads as of 2021-2022, of which  have been paved.

All of Alberta's provincial highways are maintained by Alberta Transportation (AT), a department of the Government of Alberta. The network includes two distinct series of numbered highways:

 The 1–216 series (formerly known as primary highways), making up Alberta's core highway network—typically paved and with the highest traffic volume
 The 500–986 series, providing more local access, with a higher proportion of gravel surfaces

History 
In 1926, Alberta discontinued its system of marking highways with different colours in favour of a numbering system. By 1928, the year a gravel road stretched from Edmonton to the United States border, Alberta's provincial highway network comprised .

Prior to 1973, the expanding highway system comprised one-digit and two-digit highways, with some numbers having letter suffixes (e.g., Highway 1X, Highway 26A). In 1973, a second highway system emerged, using three digits starting in the 500s and referred to as secondary roads, while the existing system continued to be referred to as provincial highways. In 1974, provincial highways became known as primary highways; and in 1990, secondary roads became known as secondary highways.

Secondary highways were abolished in 2000, with most becoming primary highways.  The expanded primary highway system was divided into two subsets: former primary highways, which became the 1–216 series; and former secondary highways, which became the 500–986 series. In 2010, all highways became known as provincial highways, while maintaining the two numbered series. Despite this, the series are still often referred to as primary and secondary highways, respectively.

1 - 216 series 

Alberta's 1 to 216 series of provincial highways are Alberta's main highways. They are numbered from 1 to 100, with the exception of the ring roads around Calgary and Edmonton, which are numbered 201 and 216 respectively. The numbers applied to these highways are derived from compounding the assigned numbers of the core north–south and east–west highways that intersect with the rings roads. In Calgary, Highway 201 is derived from the north-south Highway 2 and the east-west Highway 1. In Edmonton, Highway 216 is derived from the same north-south Highway 2 and the east-west Highway 16.

Within this series, all or portions of Highways 1, 2, 3, 4, 9, 15, 16, 28, 28A, 35, 43, 49, 63, 201 and 216 are designated core routes of Canada's National Highway System (NHS). Highway 28 from Highway 63 to Cold Lake is designated a NHS feeder route and Highway 58 between Rainbow Lake and Highway 88 is designated a NHS northern/remote route.

Highways 1, 2, 3, 4, 16, and 43 are considered Alberta's most important interprovincial and international highways and are divided highways (expressways) or freeways for much or all of their length.

The Highway 15/28A/28/63 corridor between Edmonton and Fort McMurray is considered one of Alberta's most important intraprovincial highways. It is vital to the oilsands operation. 

Although only Highways 1, 2, 3, 4, 11, 15, 16, 43, 60, 63, 100, 201, and 216 are twinned (expressways) for most of their length, the vast majority of Alberta's 1 to 216 series of highways are two-laned and paved. Only four highways within the series have segments that remained gravelled. These include segments of Highways 40, 58, and 68 and a short segment near the northern terminus of Highway 63.

Highways 1 and 16 are Trans-Canada Highway routes and are signed with TCH shields, not standard provincial shields.

X series 
The roads in the X series are typically highways that are planned realignments or spurs of existing highways. The numbers applied to each highway in the X series are derived from the highway that is planned for realignment or spurred from (e.g. Highway 16X will be a realignment of Highway 16, and Highway 10X is spur from Highway 10).

500 - 986 series 

 

Alberta's 500 - 986 series of provincial highways are generally considered local or rural highways. The 500 - 986 series of provincial highways is divided into three sub-series:

The 500/600 highways are west–east roads where the numbering increases northward from the Montana border to the Northwest Territories border.
The 700/800 highways are south–north roads where numbering increases eastward from the British Columbia border to the Saskatchewan border.
The 900 highways are newer or planned roads that have been established for future consideration as or as potential extensions or realignments of highways within the 1 - 216 series.

Some of these highways are paved, while others are entirely or partially gravel.

500

600

700

800

900 
The roads in the 900 are typically highways that are planned realignments or extensions of existing highways. The numbers applied to each highway in the 900 series are derived from the highway that is planned to be realigned or extended (e.g. Hwy 901 is a potential realignment of Hwy 1 and Hwy 986 is an extension of Hwy 686).

Park access roads 
A park access road (PAR) is an access route managed by Alberta Transportation that connects provincial parks to designated provincial highways. The following is a list of all park access roads in Alberta as of March 2017.

Urban approach roads 
An urban approach road (UAR) is an access route managed by Alberta Transportation that connects urbanized areas to designated provincial highways. The following is a list of all urban approach roads in Alberta as of March 2017.

See also 

Transportation in Calgary
Transportation in Edmonton
Transportation in Lethbridge

References

External links 

Alberta Roads
Calgary Historical Roadway Plans
Edmonton Historical Roadway Plans
Highways Development and Protection Act
Highways Development and Protection Regulation
Provincial Highways 1 - 216 Progress Chart, March 2016
Provincial Highways 500 - 986 Progress Chart, March 2016
Public Highways Act, 1922
Public Highways Act, 1929
Public Highways Act, 1942
Public Highways Development Act, 1966
Public Highways Development Act, 1980
Public Highways Development Act, 2000

Lists of roads in Canada
Highways